John Dickson (1746–1814)  was an Anglican priest in Ireland during the 18th century.

Benson was   educated at Trinity College, Dublin. He was Prebendary of Dunsfort in Down Cathedral from 1782 to 1796; and Archdeacon of Down from 1782 until his death.

Notes

Alumni of Trinity College Dublin
Archdeacons of Down
18th-century Irish Anglican priests
1814 deaths
1746 births